was the 10th daimyō of Kubota Domain in Dewa Province, Japan (modern-day Akita Prefecture), and the 28th hereditary chieftain of the Satake clan. His courtesy title was Ukyō-no-daifu and Jijū and later raised to Sakonoeshōshō and his Court rank was Junior Fourth Rank, Lower Grade.

Biography
Satake Yoshihiro was  the eldest son of Satake Yoshimasa and became daimyō on his father's death in 1815. Although Yoshimasa insisted on his deathbed that be succeeded by the head of Iwasaki Domain due to the extreme youth of Yoshihiro, a number of his senior retainers strenuously objected and insisted that Yoshihiro be recognized as daimyō.  He was received in formal audience by Shōgun Tokugawa Ienari in 1824 and his position was confirmed. In 1836, the domain petitioned that he be accorded the courtesy title of Sakonoeshōshō as this had been hereditary to the Satake clan; however, the shōgunate refused, as the previous four generations of Satake daimyō had all died relatively young and had not be awarded the title. The domain petitioned again in 1838, and was successful, albeit at a cost of 2877 ryō.

Although his father Satake Yoshimasu had been a great leader who had made giant steps to reform the domain and its finances, Yoshihiro's youth, inexperience and obsession with a vanity title, combined with repeated crop failures plunged the domain back into massive debt. Although Yoshihiro imposed sumptuary laws, crackdowns on illicit trade and violations of domain monopolies, and land reclamation around the Oga Peninsula, expenses continued to mount due to increasing demands from the shōgunate to bolster Japan's northern defenses. The domain's economic situation continued to deteriorate rather than to improve. Yoshiro died in 1846 at the age of 34. <ref name="Shichinomiya"

He was married to Eihime (1812-1840), a daughter of Maeda Toshitsuyo of Toyama Domain, and after her death remarried to Tadahime, a daughter of Ikeda Naritoshi of Tottori Domain.<ref name="Shichinomiya"

See also
Satake clan

References 

1812 births
1846 deaths
Satake clan
Tozama daimyo
People of Edo-period Japan